Saint Adalbert may refer to:

St. Adalbert of Prague (c. 956–997), Bishop of Prague, martyred in his effort to convert the Baltic Prussians to Christianity
St. Adalbert of Magdeburg (c. 910–981), known as the "Apostle of the Slavs", the first Archbishop of Magdeburg
St. Adalbert of Egmond, or "Adelbert of Egmond" (died in the first half of the 8th century AD), Northumbrian Anglo-Saxon missionary
St. Adalbard (Adalbert I of Ostrevent, died 652), founder of Marchiennes Abbey and husband of St. Rictrude
Saint-Adalbert, Quebec, a municipality in Quebec, Canada
Basilica of St. Adalbert (Grand Rapids, Michigan)

See also 
 Adalbert